= Progesterone elevation =

A progesterone elevation may refer to:

- Any elevation in progesterone
- Specifically, a progesterone level above 0.8 ng/ml on the day of induction of final maturation, as a biomarker in in vitro fertilization
